is one of the original 40 throws of Judo as developed by Kanō Jigorō.  It belongs to the fourth group of the traditional throwing list in the Gokyo no waza of the Kodokan Judo. It is also part of the current 67 Throws of Kodokan Judo.  It is classified as a foot technique (ashiwaza).

Technique History

Similar Techniques, Variants, and Aliases 
English aliases:
Large wheel

See also
 Judo technique
 The Canon Of Judo
 Danzan Ryu

External links 
 Information on the Techniques of Judo.

Judo technique
Throw (grappling)